Under the Mountains (Hungarian: Hegyek alján) is a 1920 Hungarian silent drama film directed by Béla Balogh and starring Oszkár Dénes, Ila Lóth and László Mihó.

Cast
 Oszkár Dénes - Sebastiano, földbirtokos 
 Ila Lóth - Marta, molnárlány 
 László Mihó - Maruccio, molnárinas 
 Iván Petrovich - Pedro, a pásztor  
 Magda Posner - Lujza 
 Soma Szarvasi - Tomasso apó 
 Leóna Szarvasiné

Bibliography
 Cunningham, John. Hungarian Cinema: From Coffee House to Multiplex. Wallflower Press, 2004.

External links

1920 films
Hungarian silent feature films
Hungarian drama films
Hungarian-language films
Films directed by Béla Balogh
Films set in Hungary
Films based on operas
Films based on works by Àngel Guimerà
Hungarian black-and-white films
1920 drama films
Silent drama films